Justin Barrett (born 13 April 1971) is an Irish far-right politician who has been the leader of the National Party since 2016. Barrett's activism began in the 1990s, with the anti-abortion campaign group Youth Defence. He campaigned against the Treaty of Nice in 2002 and founded the National Party in 2016. Barrett and the National Party campaigned for a No vote in the 2018 abortion referendum through the Abortion Never campaign, which functioned as "an Irish nationalist anti-abortion campaign".

His early activism focused mostly on campaigning in Irish referendums from a Eurosceptic, anti-abortion, anti-immigration, and social conservative perspective. He subsequently however moved towards far-right politics with his involvement in the National Party. Barrett has attracted controversy for his involvement with neo-Nazi groups and for making racist and homophobic remarks. In September 2019, he controversially implied that, if in power, he would strip the Irish citizenship rights of local government politician Hazel Chu, in spite of the fact she had been born in Ireland and lived there for her entire life.

Barrett himself has never held or been elected to any public office. He contested the 2004 European Election as an independent, receiving 2.4% of the vote in the East constituency and failing to be elected. Barrett also contested the 2021 Dublin Bay South by-election for the National Party, receiving 183 first-preference votes (0.68%), thus failing to be elected.

Early life
Barrett was born in Cork city in 1971 and was adopted when he was five years old by a family in Borrisokane, County Tipperary. Slevin was his adopted parents' name. He identified as Justin Slevin for a period but eventually settled on Barrett, his biological parents' name. Barrett is a graduate in Business Studies from Athlone RTC.

Political activism

Early activism (1987–1991)
In 1991, he was involved in Young Fine Gael but left because of what he called the cynicism of the party.

Youth Defence (1992–2004)
From 1992 he became actively involved in the Irish anti-abortion movement, becoming the leader of Youth Defence. As a student in Athlone RTC he unsuccessfully contested the election for the Presidency of Union of Students in Ireland. During the 1995 divorce referendum, he was spokesman for the Youth Against Divorce campaign. In later years, Barrett himself sought a divorce in 2016.

In April 1999, Barrett and seven other Youth Defence members were convicted of public order offences for a protest described at the time as a "mini-riot" outside the Adelaide Hospital that had taken place on 16 May 1998. Despite requests from hospital staff, the son of a dying woman and Gardaí to be quiet, a Youth Defence protest outside the hospital got louder and lead to "pandemonium" when Gardaí intervened. Some of the convictions were successfully appealed, two years later, and while Barret's appeal was disallowed, he was given the benefit of the Probation Act, meaning no criminal conviction was recorded against him.

He was also involved in the campaign against the 2002 abortion referendum. He left Youth Defence in 2004 because he thought their methods of campaigning and interacting with people were becoming increasingly extreme and counterproductive. By 2016, Youth Defence were claiming to have never heard of Justin Barrett, or ever to have had any dealing with him.

No to Nice Campaign
In 2001, a referendum was held in Ireland to approve the Treaty of Nice. However the Treaty of Nice was rejected by 54% of the Irish people in what is known as the Nice I referendum. The following year a second referendum was held on the Treaty of Nice, known as the Nice II referendum. Justin Barrett campaigned against the Nice Treaty in both referendums. Barrett, then 31 years-old, established the No to Nice campaign with Rory O'Hanlon, a retired High Court judge.

During the second Nice campaign, Barrett became the centre of a controversy over his participation in neo-fascist events in Germany and Italy. Barrett initially denied, and subsequently admitted that he had spoken at an event organised by the NPD, a far right, ultranationalist political party. Justin Barrett has always claimed that he spoke at these events in an anti-abortion capacity on behalf on the Youth Defence Organisation.

2004 European Parliament election
In 2004 Barrett announced his independent candidacy for the European Parliament election of the same year for the East constituency. He set up his headquarters in Drogheda, an area which had experienced a large influx of non-nationals. Gerry McGeough, a former Provisional IRA volunteer and Sinn Féin national executive member, defected to Barrett's campaign. Barrett also supported the Citizenship referendum which was held on the same day as the European Parliament election.

Barrett's campaign focused on immigration, Euroscepticism and abortion. Barrett employed nationalist rhetoric during his campaign and stated his intention to "put Ireland first" in the European Parliament. Barrett campaigned alongside his wife at the time Bernadette and their son Michael.

He achieved 10,997 first preference votes or 2.4% of the total vote in the East constituency and failed to be elected.

Later that year, while attending an immigration debate at University College Dublin's Literary & Historical Society, Barrett was assaulted by attendees allegedly belonging to an Irish anti-fascist group. The debate was chaired by popular RTÉ radio presenter Joe Duffy, and featured Áine Ní Chonaill of Immigration Control Platform.

National Party (2016–present)

In a press release in November 2016, Justin Barrett announced that he was President of the newly founded National Party, a political party that would oppose multi-culturalism and abortion. While Barrett had previously promoted the idea of a "Catholic republic", the National Party states that it is a secular party. The party was due to be publicly launched in a press event on 17 November 2016 at the Merrion Hotel in Dublin. However, after a public backlash, the hotel cancelled the event. Barrett called for a complete ban on Muslims entering Ireland and for the introduction of racial profiling. The party formally registered in early April 2019. Barrett has stated that the party is "only for straight Irish people".

While a Eurosceptic, Barrett does not advocate leaving the European Union ("Irexit"). Quoted in August 2019, Barrett reputedly believes that Ireland could have entered bilateral negotiations with the United Kingdom immediately after the Brexit referendum in 2016 and agreed to a separate deal with the British and then to have the EU accept that deal as part of their own negotiations with the British government. He criticised the Irish government and by extension the European Union's handling of Brexit. In September 2019, Barrett was milkshaked in Galway at a National Party protest. In October 2019 he addressed a community meeting in his hometown of Borrisokane on plans to open up a Direct Provision centre for 80 asylum seekers. An edited, audio-only version of his speech was played on the Claire Byrne Live show on RTÉ One.

As leader of the party, Barrett led the National Party to a total of 4,773 votes (0.2%) in the 2020 Irish general election, failing to win any seats.

2018 Irish abortion referendum
Barrett founded Abortion Never as a No campaign in March 2018 to contest the Irish abortion referendum, 2018. Abortion Never presents itself as "an Irish nationalist anti-abortion campaign". At the launch of the campaign, Barrett stated that if the abortion referendum passed, it would lead to euthanasia for the elderly; "It doesn’t just begin with abortion and stop there. It ends in euthanasia, because they already have a plan. You see discussions in the newspapers sometimes, ‘What are we going to do about the pensions crisis?’". At the same event, he called for the abortion referendum campaign to be "as divisive as possible". Ultimately, the referendum was approved by 66.4% of voters, with a 64.1% turnout.

In April 2018, Jim Jefferies featured Barrett on a segment of The Jim Jefferies Show. Jefferies had Barrett travel to London for an interview on abortion (despite already being in Ireland to interview Tara Flynn), "so he could endure the same kind of bullshit every Irish woman has to go through if they want an abortion".

2021 Dublin Bay South by-election
In June 2021, he announced he would be running for public office for the first time as leader of the National Party, in the 2021 Dublin Bay South by-election, caused by the resignation of Eoghan Murphy. Using the campaign slogan "Right So Far", he finished 11th of 15 candidates, gaining 0.68% of first-preferences, with 183 votes. He was eliminated on the third count. The seat went to Ivana Bacik of the Labour Party.

Publications
Barrett self-published a book in 1998 in which he set out his political principles and advocated the creation of a "Catholic Republic". Entitled The National Way Forward!, in its text he described immigration as "genocidal", and cited Hilaire Belloc, G. K. Chesterton and Arthur Penty as having been influential figures in his philosophical development. He also promoted the work of Father Denis Fahey. During the 2002 Nice Treaty referendum campaign, some of the ideologies in Barrett's 1998 book The National Way Forward! were queried by those advocating a "yes" vote, and it was noted that the book had "mysteriously disappeared from bookshelves during the campaign". Some commentators suggested that the "Barrett controversy" had shifted focus away from other issues and assisted the "yes" campaign.

Controversies

Interactions with neo-Nazi and neo-fascist groups

National Democratic Party of Germany
Barrett spoke at events organised by the neo-Nazi National Democratic Party of Germany (NPD) several times, and was the guest of honour at a NPD rally in Passau, Germany in 2000, in which anti-semitic speeches, peppered with quotes from Adolf Hitler were given, alongside claims that "Germany was the biggest victim of the second World War", and at which hundreds of skinheads gave standing ovations to elderly Nazis.
 The NPD confirmed that they had been in contact with Youth Defence for at least 6 years before.

He attended two conferences, in October 1999 and 2000, organised by the youth wing of the NPD, the Junge Nationalisten (JN), alongside American white nationalist William Luther Pierce. The JN has spoken about how Youth Defence were an important part of their network.

The National Party and Barrett have stated that he addressed meetings all across Europe in his capacity as an anti-abortion speaker. He has stated that he regrets "not being more careful" regarding his attendance of events held by the NPD in Germany.

Forza Nuova (Italy)
In June 2001, the website of neo-Fascist group Forza Nuova reported that Justin Barrett had attended a number of their events in Italy (in Milan, and Bologna). He attended and spoke at a Forza Nuova meeting in Milan in November 2002.  Barrett shared a platform with Roberto Fiore at a rally of Italian fascists at the Hotel Miramar on 20 and 21 July 2001, in the Italian city of Civitanova Marche. At the rally, Barrett was joined by Mario Di Giovanni, Youth Defence's representative in Italy. A group of Forza Nuova students, led by the then 25-year-old Marco Gladi, visited Ireland in 2001 to "study" with Youth Defence. In an editorial on the Forza Nuova website, the movement calls itself a "friend" of Mr Barrett and praises his efforts to defeat the Nice Treaty.

Homophobic remarks and activities 

In 2017, during the party's first ard-fheis held at the Trump International Golf Links and Hotel Ireland, Barrett stated that the National Party was "only for straight Irish people" and defended perceived homophobic comments made by James Reynolds, causing guest speaker John Wilson to walk out of the event in protest.

In 2020, Barrett was involved in the organisation of protests against the Minister for Children, Roderic O'Gorman, and attended these protests alongside members of the National Party. O'Gorman had been attacked by members of the Irish far-right on social media after his appointment as Minister for Children, due to tweeting a photo of himself with Peter Tatchell at a Dublin Pride parade in 2018. Tatchell had previously attracted controversy for statements made in 1997 regarding the age of consent laws in Britain. Tatchell later clarified these remarks, saying sex with children was impossible to condone. "This means I condemn it - I oppose adults having sex with children." During a protest, Barrett riled up the crowd against a group of anti-homophobia counter-protestors, causing attendees to rush at the smaller group of counter-protestors and resulting in Garda intervention.

O'Gorman said that he was unaware of the views expressed by Tatchell 20 years previously, stating he "probably would have re-considered taking a photo with him" had he read the 1997 letter before the march. He continued, "I would have seen him primarily as an advocate for LGBT rights in the UK in the 1990s and 2002 but more recently particularly vocal on treatment of LGBT people in Russia and Chechnya." While Barrett alleged that O'Gorman was a "paedophile apologist", O'Gorman has publicly stated his condemnation of paedophilia and stated that the accusations made against him were "rooted in homophobia".

Racist remarks 

In a September 2019 video, Barrett stated that if his party were to gain power he would revoke the Irish citizenship of Green Party councillor and later Lord Mayor of Dublin, Hazel Chu. Chu was born in Dublin and lived in Ireland since birth. Barrett stated, "She is an Irish citizen, I accept that, that is the law until we get the law in our own hands". Later, a Twitter account operated by Barrett's wife made disparaging and racist comments towards Chu. Chu, in response, stated that she refused to be intimidated by such tactics.

Garda investigation 

In January 2021, a car being driven by Barrett was seized by Gardaí after it emerged it had not been taxed since November 2019. Barrett was investigated by Gardaí for alleged road traffic offences and breach of COVID-19 pandemic travel restrictions. In October 2021, in an appearance before Longford District Court, he was charged with driving without a licence or insurance, and with failing to produce both documents and an NCT certificate within ten days. Arising from the same incident, which occurred in Clonfin, County Longford, he was also accused of engaging in threatening and abusive behaviour contrary to the Public Order Act. He remained silent at the hearing and his solicitor said that he was reserving his position and made a motion for the disclosure of prosecution evidence. The judge granted the order and remanded Barrett on bail until a sitting of Longford District Court on 23 November 2021.

Personal life
In 2004, Justin Barrett was married to Bernadette Barrett (née Carroll) and they had four children. Barrett divorced his first wife in 2017. Having previously campaigned against the legalisation of divorce, Barrett denied that he was being hypocritical, stating that he had "changed his mind" on divorce.

Barrett later married Rebecca, a primary school teacher from Limerick, and they have four children. She has also been involved in the National Party and was a candidate in the 2020 Irish general election for the Limerick City constituency. She received 345 (0.7%) first preference votes and was eliminated on the second count.

See also
Abortion in the Republic of Ireland
Niamh Uí Bhriain

References

External links 

 

1971 births
Living people
Irish anti-communists
Irish far-right politicians
Irish anti-abortion activists
People from County Tipperary
Alumni of Athlone Institute of Technology